5, The Grove is a semi-detached house in Highgate, London. It is listed Grade II on the National Heritage List for England.

Originally built around 1688, it was rebuilt around 1933 by C. H. James, yet retained its general appearance. The house consists of three storeys with a basement, built in red brick. The interior has been substantially altered since it was built. During James's remodelling of the house in the 1930s, several examples of early 18th-century wallpapers were found hidden behind wooden panelling, which were subsequently donated to the Victoria and Albert Museum. Wooden railings surround the front of the house, and a lantern surmounts the front entrance. Prior to his death in 2016, George Michael was the sole tenant of this building.

In 2020, the house was bought for £19 million by Stephen Cameron and his wife, Clare Harrison, who made £170 million from selling the medical PR firm Nucleus Global.

References

Grade II listed houses in the London Borough of Camden
Highgate
Houses in the London Borough of Camden
George Michael